Thomas John Jaeschke (born September 4, 1993) is an American professional volleyball player. He is a member of the US national team, and a bronze medalist at the Olympic Games Rio 2016. At the professional club level, he plays for Halkbank Ankara.

Personal life
He is the son of John and Danielle Jaeschke. Thomas has a twin sister named Jaime and a brother named Joseph (1990) Jaeschke went to Wheaton-Warrenville South High School and reached the final of the Illinois state championship in 2010 and winning the finals in his senior season in 2012. 

Jaeschke was studying finance at Loyola University Chicago, but he interrupted his studies to start his professional career in Asseco Resovia Rzeszów. He went back to college to finish his undergraduate degree during the summer of 2022, therefore missing the 2022 FIVB Volleyball Men's World Championship.

Career

College
He played for Loyola Ramblers for three seasons; 2013-2015. He reached the semifinals of the 2013 NCAA Men's DI-II National Championship, and won the 2014 and 2015 NCAA Men's DI-II National Championships. He was named to the NCAA All-Tournament Team in 2014 and 2015, and in 2015 he was named AVCA Player of the Year. After his junior year of college, he interrupted his studies to sign a three-year contract with Polish club Asseco Resovia Rzeszów, who were the Polish Champions in the previous season. This was his first professional contract of his career. Jaeschke would later sit out the first half of his second professional season to complete his college degree. In 2017 he moved to Italian club Calzedonia Verona.

National team
Jaeschke made his debut on the national team during the 2015 NORCECA Champions Cup. He was named to the U.S. national team for the 2015 FIVB World League where the team would capture the bronze medal. He missed competing in the 2015 FIVB World Cup due to injury. In June 2016, Jaeschke was named to the U.S. Olympic Men's Volleyball team for the 2016 Olympic Games in Rio de Janeiro where they would go on to win the bronze medal.

Honours

Clubs
 National championships
 2015/2016  Polish Championship, with Asseco Resovia
 2022/2023  Chinese Championship, with Beijing BAIC Motor

Individual awards
 AVCA National Player of the Year – 2015
 AVCA First-Team All-American – 2014, 2015
 NCAA Championship All-Tournament Team – 2014, 2015
 MIVA Player of the Year – 2014, 2015
 MIVA Freshman of the Year – 2013
 MIVA All-Conference First Team – 2013, 2014, 2015
 MIVA All-Tournament Most Valuable Player – 2015 
 MIVA All-Tournament Team – 2013, 2015
 MIVA Academic All-Conference – 2013, 2014, 2015

References

External links

 Player profile at TeamUSA.org
 
 Player profile at LegaVolley.it 
 Player profile at PlusLiga.pl 
 
 
 Player profile at Volleybox.net

1993 births
Living people
Sportspeople from Wheaton, Illinois
American men's volleyball players
Volleyball players at the 2016 Summer Olympics
Volleyball players at the 2020 Summer Olympics
Medalists at the 2016 Summer Olympics
Olympic bronze medalists for the United States in volleyball
American expatriate sportspeople in Poland
Expatriate volleyball players in Poland
American expatriate sportspeople in Italy
Expatriate volleyball players in Italy
American expatriate sportspeople in China
Expatriate volleyball players in China
American expatriate sportspeople in Turkey
Expatriate volleyball players in Turkey
Loyola Ramblers men's volleyball players
Resovia (volleyball) players
Blu Volley Verona players
Halkbank volleyball players
Outside hitters